Samuel Kwadwo Boaben (1957–2016) also known as Bishop Bob Okala, was a Ghanaian comedian and actor popular for the comic roles he played on GTV program Key Soap Concert Party. Bob Okala gained popularity in the 80s, 90s and the turn of the millennium when stand-up comedy and pantomime began to gain widespread appeal on television. He is widely regarded as one of the comedy giants of Ghana and a pioneer of stand-up comedy. Okala was a household name and a fan favourite during the his height of his fame. Originally, Okala started out as a footballer, playing amateur and semi-professional football for local clubs like Fankobaa and others. However, his inability to earn a decent living from football, coupled with a long-term hip injury and limited prospects of a breakthrough forced him to seek a new career elsewhere.

Around this time, Okala was already honing his skills in comedy and had begun to attract attention from various band leaders who recognised his skills. Hence, he branched into comedy when Senior Eddie Donkor, a popular hilife musician recruited him to add comedy element to his live band and staged performances. Around this time, most theatre groups added comedy and solos to their performances during preludes and interludes to entertain the audiences. After a stint with Senior Eddie Donkor, he joined Nana Ampadu and his African Brothers Band who toured the country widely and played at most of the popular venues. Okala then rejoined Senior Eddie Donkor on tour for nearly a decade. He learned to play the guitar whiles touring with various live bands and theatre groups. Whiles working as a part-time comedian, Okala also worked as a baker who distributed his bread to various local vendors.

Bob Okala was a contemporary of several other popular Ghanaian comedians such as Waterproof, Nkomode, Agya Koo, Bob Santo, Judas, Akrobeto, Araba Stamp, Koo Nimo and many others who pioneered panto and stand-up comedy in Ghana when television began to reach the masses. Okala's rise to fame is closely linked to Key Soap Concert Party which became the primetime Saturday night entertainment event at the National Theatre. He won the Key Soap Concert Party "Champion of Champions" title on two occasions. At the time, his main rivals for the coveted title were Agya Koo and Nkomode. Okala had a distinctive comedy style and unique stage presence, including excessively chalked lips and eyes rimmed with chalky white powder, over-sized spectacles, an unduly long tie which reached below the knee, using an hour-glass shaped traditional wooden pestle (tapoli) as a bow tie, wearing socks on both hands, tucking his trousers into his socks, and strapping a wall clock on his hand as a wristwatch which he occasionally at to tell the time. Naturally, Okala's exaggerated sense of time always generated immense laughter from the audience, given that his notion of time always exceeded that of the normal 24hr clock.

During the height of his fame, he performed in Germany, the Netherlands, Canada, Italy and other countries by the invitation of the Ghanaian diaspora.

Just prior to his demise, Bob Okala took part in Ghana's 59th Independence Day celebrations where he donned colonial style police uniform with other veteran actors to dramatize a short play for the spectators. The then president, John Dramani Mahama and other dignitaries were in attendance. Okala died a week later. Circumstances surrounding his death indicate that he collapsed immediately after a live performance at the Koforidua Jackson Park. Originally, Okala was not billed for the event but chose to show up to give his support and contribute to the performances. Organisers of the event had initially questioned his fitness to perform, given his history of long-term illness, and the fact that he was looking visibly lean at the time. Hence, they tried in vain to persuade him not to mount the stage on account of his ill-health. However, he persisted and gave them assurances that he's perfectly capable of delivering his show. After his sudden collapse, he was rushed to the Koforidua Regional Hospital where he was pronounced dead. He was laid in state at the Accra Arts Center from the 9th to the 11th of June, 2016, after which his body was laid to rest in the Ashanti Region.

References 

2016 deaths
Ghanaian comedians
Ghanaian television actors
1957 births